Iru Willk'i (Aymara iru spiny Peruvian feather grass, willk'i gap, "Peruvian feather grass gap", also spelled Iru Willkhi) is a  mountain in the Andes of Bolivia. It is located in the Oruro Department, San Pedro de Totora Province. It lies at the Q'ara Quta River.

References 

Mountains of Oruro Department